Vinci is a  of the Metropolitan City of Florence in the Italian region of Tuscany. The birthplace of Renaissance polymath Leonardo da Vinci lies just outside the town.

Main sights
Museo Leonardiano, museum of Leonardo da Vinci. This museum has displays of some of the inventions that are drawn in Leonardo's notebooks.
Casa Natale di Leonardo, the birthplace of Leonardo da Vinci, situated approximately 3 km to the northeast of Vinci in the frazione of Anchiano. There are some reproductions of his drawings at the house.
Church of Santa Croce, built in the 13th century but later remade in neo-Renaissance style.

Twin towns
Vinci has two official sister cities as designated by Sister Cities International:

 Allentown, USA
 Amboise, France

References

External links

Museo Leonardiano

Cities and towns in Tuscany
Hilltowns in Tuscany